, often abbreviated , is a Japanese adult visual novel developed by  and released for the PC on August 28, 2009 (first press version) as a DVD and on October 30, 2009 (regular version) as two DVDs. An English translation of the PC version was made by JAST USA and was to be available in 2019, but was delayed to be released on December 25, 2020, first as a digital game, with the physical Collector's Edition released in February 2021.

A sequel entitled Maji de Watashi ni Koishinasai!! S was released in 2012, and a series of five fandiscs called Maji de Watashi ni Koishinasai!! A were released throughout 2013.

A manga adaptation has been publishing in Comp Ace since May 2010 and an anime television series adaptation animated by Lerche aired from October to December 2011. Sentai Filmworks licensed the anime series for North America under the title Majikoi ~ Oh! Samurai Girls for streaming, and for home video release in 2012. MVM films has licensed the series in the UK for release in 2013.

Plot
Kawakami City is famous for its strong dedication to its samurai ancestors. A healthy fighting spirit is always valued and it is even an important factor for success at school. Our hero Yamato, a second year student from Kawakami Academy, is always with his close friends (three boys and three girls). They have all known each other since they were young and have done many things together. While they have many other friends, this group of seven is a close-knit, inseparable group. They even have a secret base where they meet. With the new semester, they welcome two girls into their group and shortly after things begin to change.

Characters

Kazama Family

The protagonist of video game and anime series. Yamato had a high degree of intelligence and understanding even from his young age. He is the tactician of the group and often makes schemes regarding how to make money or beat others with trickery. His tactics earn him the respect and admiration of many people, especially his friends. His relationship with Momoyo is of an underling as a result of a promise he made when they were younger. At one point while they were kids, Momoyo confessed that she really liked Yamato and even asked for him follow her forever. It is shown that Yamato is much smarter than he actually acts out to be. He has an extreme love for his hermit crabs, Yadon and Karin, and gets extremely upset when people even joke about disturbing them to the point he scares them. Yamato has a huge social network of associates and contacts, but he only considers the members of the Kazama family to be his 'True friends'. Yamato lives in the Shimazu dorm as both his parents live overseas with his father abandoning Japan due to no one being able to declare out loud what they love but instead, would be allowed to declare what they hated. This prompted Yamato to become the Prime minister in order to change Japan so that his father would return. Even though Yamato uses his brains instead of his body to fight, Yamato has proved that he is capable of fighting by relying on his speed, mobility and reflexes to counter his opponent and then strike vital spots to bring them down. He is the target of affection from many of the girls in Kawakami City, Kawakami Academy, and the Kazama family, especially from Momoyo and Miyako. In Fandisk game A-1, he marries Azumi, but notably Miyako becomes pregnant in the first game in her route at the end with his child named after Naoe Kanetsugu, the legendary Sengoku warrior. In the final game that wraps A series, Maji de Watashi ni Koi Shinasai! A+, Yamato and Momoyo confirms the feelings they have for each other and Momoyo ends the long series by saying: Maji de watashi ni koi shinasai! 

As the oldest member of the Kawakami Family, Momoyo is seen as the older sister of the group. She gets challenged on almost a daily basis by fighters around the world and even students from other schools who seek recognition and fame. However, she effortlessly defeats them all too easily to the point she gets frustrated which she takes out on Yamato by teasing him. She is the most beautiful girl in both Kawakami Academy and Kawakami City, but due to her fighting strength, every male is too intimidated to talk to her. Momoyo is also a regular guest on the Kawakami Academy radio show, as many people request her appearance on it. Sometimes though, she forgets to pay up by the deadline and she gets Yamato to extend it for her. In the end she is always able to pay back what she owes. Despite her strength, she hates to study and usually gets poor grades for it. Due to this she is unable to join S-class as the requirements include being in the top fifty of the exams ranking. She is bisexually flirtatious (reminiscent of Shinra from Kimi ga Aruji de Shitsuji ga Ore de) and will make a pass at girls as she considers no males to be men due to her high standards, although defeating her in a fight, even if just barely, will make her think otherwise. Many people consider hers and Yamato's relationship as something deeper and even describe it as interesting and special. She also consider Yamato the only person in the world who she can do certain things to in an intimate nature, as well as believing that he is the only one who can make her truly. She eventually realizes that she is in love with Yamato. Momoyo is considered to be the strongest fighter in the world, second only to her grandfather. However, despite all her so-powerful fists, she is terrified of ghosts and spirits, as she feels that nothing she can do will affect them. She is friends and rivals with Ageha Kuki from Kimi ga Aruji de Shitsuji ga Ore de.

Second daughter of the Kawakami family, and Yamato's classmate. Kazuko is known for her cheerful demeanor and never-give-up attitude despite being known as a crybaby when she was younger. She is an orphan and was adopted by an old lady in her youth. However, the foster mother died and Kazuko was adopted by the Kawakami family at Momoyo's request. Since then, she has grown to love her new family, especially Momoyo and hardly considers finding her real parents as a result. She is always training and always looking for a good fight in order to become both a suitable opponent for Momoyo and also a training assistant at the Kawakami temple. She is the target of admiration and affection from both Hideo Kuki and Tadakatsu Minamoto, the latter of whom, she knows from the orphanage and also live in the Shimazu dorm with members of the Kazama family. She uses a naginata with her unquestionable speed and has developed a rivalry with Chris. She is nicknamed "Wanko" due to having dog like tendencies, such as responding to a whistle that each member of the Kazama family uses in order to call her. She is capable of studying harder than she exercises once she gets started, but due to her interests in being a training assistant, she hardly does so. She has a friendly relationship with Minamoto Tadakatsu, who she looks up to like an older brother and calls 'Taku-chan', although Tadakatsu has strong feelings for her but is yet to act on them.

Another girl of Yamato's childhood friends. She is cute but shy, and in the same class of Yamato. A first rate archer who is seen to be unmatched her accuracy is always seen to be 100%. She is madly in love with Yamato since they were kids due to him defending her from bullies. Despite her advances, Yamato shows little interest in her as any more than a friend and tends to find her advances annoying at times and disturbing at others. She hardly ever talks to anyone outside the Kazama family due to her childhood, as she was constantly picked on for being too skinny. Many members of the Kazama family have grown to regret this as Miyako's parents were going through a divorce at the time, making the harassment that much harder for her to deal with. However, she deeply cares for the Kazama family and puts in extra effort to keep the hideout tidy. She is considered a beautiful girl at Kawakami Academy, but due to her affection for Yamato, many people figure that she is already his woman, despite Yamato constantly rejecting her. She also acknowledges Yamato's and Momoyo's close relationship but still refuses to give up. She is also shown to be intelligent enough to join S-Class, the elite of Kawakami Academy. In the game, there are routes where Yamato accepts Miyako's affection, and even if she doesn't end up with Yamato she; however, raises his child alone and still loves him decades later.

Yukie is a first-year transfer student that has tasked herself with making one hundred friends. Her extreme shyness and strange reactions around people have done more harm than good in her goal. She regularly talks to a small horse-shaped phone strap named Matsukaze which responds to her and other people using ventriloquism. She is an extremely strong swordswoman as she is the daughter of the 11th sword saint Mayuzumi. She describes her father as "tough but respectful" but due to her constant training, she failed to make any friends growing up. She moved to the Shimazu dorm in Kawakami City with the intent of making friends and growing as a person. She eventually summons her courage and requests that she be friends with the Kazama family which Shoichi agrees to (but before rejecting her in a joking manner, causing her to faint). Through her efforts and with Yamato's help, she is able to make friends with Iyo Oowada, a student of Kawakami Academy in her same class. Mayuzumi is also skilled enough to enter Class-S of her year. She has a liking to Gakuto as he reminds her of her father. She also has a younger sister.

Christiane is a transfer student from Germany who knows little about Japan outside of what she had seen in jidaigeki dramas. She tends not to read the atmosphere when problems arise but follows Yamato's orders to exactly what he says. She wields a unique fencing blade which she uses with great speed. She acts flustered around Yamato as these two tend to end up in unusual situations. She has a strong sense of justice which served to put her and Yamato at odds as Yamato uses dirty tricks and any means necessary to win. However, she eventually understands that Yamato uses such tactics in order to protect his friends above all else and she approves of it. She has a sister type relationship with her father's lieutenant Margit and they even sleep in the same bed. She is extremely loving towards her father, who in turn is extremely protective of Christiane to the point of threatening any boy who tries to flirt with her. She also has an extreme passion for teddy bear collecting, with her room being full of them. Christiane also has a rivalry with Kazuko and they compete in all sorts of areas such as running and squatting, with Christiane being the victor more often.

Gakuto is the muscle of the Kazama family (from the male's side) and is both tall and muscular. He has a strong desire to have a girlfriend but he only considers girls who are the same age or older than him. However, he has little to no luck with girls and is a source of comedy due to his failures. Despite this he never gives up and he believes that muscles are what attract women. Though he is not as strong as the girls of the Kazama family (because he never learned any fighting style and only focused on building his muscle body), he is a capable fighter in his own right and is able to endure attacks from Christiane, Momoyo and Kazuko, albeit not to a high degree. He is best friends with Moro and the two are constantly seen together, with people making boys love jokes about them which only serves to disgust them. Both Gakuto and Moro refuse to lose to each other as men, but get along best regardless. Easily the most openly perverted of the group, he feels like he can only talk to Yamato about girls as Shoichi has no interest and Moro is too shy. His family owns both the Shimazu dorm where Yamato and other members of the Kazama family reside and the building where the Kazama family's hideout is located.

The leader of the Kazama Family and Yamato's best friend nicknamed "Capt." by his friends. He and Yamato met when the latter ran away from home on day and Shoichi was playing in a cardboard box in a field. While there was a bit of tension at first, the two became friends quickly and have been friends ever since. Shoichi is a boy that, unlike his peers, is more interested in adventure and having fun than chasing girls around. His tendency to take the helm in times of fun has earned him the respect of his friends, as well as his nickname. He is described as a man with the most luck in the Kazama family as it seems like he can do anything without even trying with the exception of studying and academics due to him not even trying. His trademark is a red bandana with a dragon on it which he is seen wearing almost all the time. He has little ability to read the mood or sensitivity to certain topics which tends to disturb and embarrass others. Whenever he is left out of certain situations and arrives at the scene to find that Yamato has already taken care of it, he tends to throw a fit like a little kid. Shoichi is also extremely popular with girls, with him being ranked as one of the four most handsome males at Kawakami Academy. Momoyo also acknowledges Shoichi as a man, due to him not surrendering the leadership of the Kazama family to her while they were kids.

The Kazama family's resident geek. Nicknamed 'Moro', he is a classic Otaku as he loves both anime and manga. He is also very skilled with computers and other I.T. equipment, and tends to talk too much about them without noticing. He is shy and awkward around girls but is comfortable with the girls in the Kazama family. He is best friends with Gakuto and is constantly seen with him, making people joke about their 'boys love' which only serves to disgust them both. Both he and Gakuto refuse to lose to each other as men, but get along best with each other regardless. It is shown he has a secret interest in Miyako despite Miyakos openness about her affection for Yamato. Moro is able to cross dress like a girl which he finds extremely embarrassing, especially as men such as Gakuto in particular, find him attractive this way. He is the least perverted of the males from the Kazama Family and keeps his desires too himself while scarcely being a bit more open about it at times. Like Miyako, he highly values the members of the Kazama family and found it unsettling to invite Christiane and Yukie into the group. Eventually though, Moro was able to welcome them both.

A fellow school student who resides in the Shimazu dorm. His nickname from everyone is 'Gen' or 'Gen-san' but he gets called 'Tacchan' from Kazuko. He has a very mean look but is a really nice person. Having grown up in the same orphanage was Kazuko, Tadakatsu and Kazuko have known each other since they were kids and have been friends since. Eventually both were adopted with Tadakatsu being taken in by Usami Kyojin, a teacher at Kawakami Academy and also the boss of a small 'odd jobs' company which Tadakatsu is also an employee and future successor of. He tends to receive cake as a token of appreciation for his jobs, which he tends to share with Yamato. He has a secret affection towards Kazuko since they were kids, which is made evident by the way he looks out for her and the way he treats her nicely compared to everyone else. This puts him at odds with Hideo Kuki who also has feelings for Kazuko. Despite him rather being alone, Tadakatsu is extremely popular and is even ranked as one of the four most handsome males in Kawakami Academy. Since he tends to scowl all time, many people are taken aback whenever he smiles or shares a kind word with people as it tends to lift their spirits.

Kawakami Academy

Class 2-S

The class representative of the S-class, and middle child of the Kuki family. He has a crush on Kazuko. He fell in love with Kazuko's attitude of always trying to surpass her previous self and her will to never give up. He is the one who created Cookie and gave it to Kazuko. Hideo believes he is going to be the future ruler of the world since he is superior to the rest of the people for being a member of the Kuki Family. Hideo has only recognized Aoi as his equal because his intellect is on an equal level with him. Because of this, he also considers him a friend and listens to what he has to say. He also tends to argue with the members of Kazama Family when they are too friendly with Kazuko, or when they interrupt his attempt to talk with Kazuko. He also has a bit of a rivalry with Shoichi.

Hideo's bodyguard and maid, she's also quite a powerful fighter. She's 29 and very sensitive about her age. She's in love with Hideo, but he only considers her only an exemplary servant. When Hideo is not watching, she tends to be foul mouthed and aggressive. In the game's particular route, Yamato advises Azumi to forward her unrequited love for Hideo and advance, tired of her motionless life. Seeing that her emotional state does not seem to make any progress, Yamato notices different sides of Azumi, and instead undertakes the time consuming labor of making Azumi his lover.

An intelligent and handsome schemer, Touma largely serves as the brains of class 2S. He is just as sneaky as Yamato and the two appear to enjoy their rivalry. Very popular with the ladies for his looks and good manners, he's able to use this to advantage quite well. He's bisexual and flirts with anyone he's interested, except Jun and Koyuki, since they're like family to him.

Arather pretty but detached girl that clings to both Touma and Jun. She appears quite lost without them. Beneath the pretty exterior, she seems quite unhinged. She always listens to what Touma says and likes making fun of Jun's lolicon tendencies and his bald head.

One of the more normal people in the cast, despite his bald head, he's quite strong, fast and coolheaded, but due to his lolicon tendencies the story frequently makes him the butt of jokes. He's almost as fast as Kazama and despite Azumi constantly beating him up she knows he's quite strong and is choosing not to fight back.

A bratty and childish member of class 2S, Kokoro is quite aware that nobody really takes her seriously and that she's frequently laughed at. While haughty, she's actually nicer than she seems. She is surprisingly competent in a fight, but she always cries when she loses.

A Special forces soldier from the German military, and a subordinate of Chris' father, Lieutenant General Frank Friedrich, who sent Margit to protect her. Though placed in a different class, Margit is highly protective of Chris, whom she views as a little sister. She loves to fight, which sometimes interferes with her duties, but since she's also quite tough she has a pretty good track record. She wears an eyepatch to limit her strength, and takes it off when the need arises.

Class 2-F

An unathletic member of class 2F, Suguru scorns the real world, especially real women. He's intelligent and calculating to an extent, but a complete otaku to the core. His first girlfriend dumped him and left him with a burning hatred of all real people. He frequently states that 2D girls will never betray him.

A short, monkey like member of class 2F. His raging perversion puts even the likes of Gakuto to shame. Nicknamed Yonpachi for memorizing all 48 positions of the Kama Sutra.

A massive but kind member of class 2F, Kuma is actually pretty physically powerful. Due to being a rather nice guy and knowing all about food, he has a lot of friends. He's not a martial artist and does not like fighting, but he'll start to rampage if he goes too long without eating.

The small, pink-haired class representative of 2-F, who despite her size and the fact that no one takes her seriously, she views herself as the Big Sister type. She and Chika are friends for the simple reason that Chika stood up for her when she was being bullied for being poor.

A pretty and popular girl in class 2F, Chika is more or less a standard teenager. While generally being a fairly nice person, there are both boys and girls that do not like her and she responds in kind.

A somewhat unpleasant girl in Ganguro style from class 2F, Haguro tends to be the butt of jokes when Gakuto and the others are not available. She has little in the way of sympathetic moments, but during Momo's route she sacrifices herself in the war game to protect 2F's flag and is beaten unconscious for her efforts.

Other Students

A new transfer student, Iyo is Mayucchi's first friend outside the Kazama family. She is a major baseball fan to the point where she loses control and becomes a different person who usually gets overheated in her passion.

A brash and arrogant first year student, Kosugi tries to pick fights and intends to be the strongest student in the school. She completely fails to realize that not only is Mayucchi much stronger than she is but probably the second strongest student in the entire school behind only Momoyo.

The head of the archery club. An extremely serious and stern girl with a secret desire to be cute and girly with a schoolgirl crush on Touma.

One of the Big Four alongside Momoyo, Yukie and Ageha, while she does have impressive physical ability, it's obvious that her real strength lies in manipulation and tactics. She enjoys teasing Yamato. While using a large variety of weapons, it's noted that she's not as good with a naginata as Wanko or a rapier as Chris. Her tactics can also be pretty dirty, but she's rather upfront about that.

Hikoichi is a third year and classmate of Momoyo's. He is the last of the "Elegante Quatro", the four most popular boys in school to be introduced. He is extremely composed, intelligent, and can use kotodamas to influence peoples minds, making him a formidable opponent.

A bizarre student who always wears an Indian headdress and also happens to be the Student Council President somehow. Most people do not remember her real name.

Teaching Staff

Head of the Kawakami Temple, Principal of the Kawakami Academy, master of Kawakami-Ryu, and Momoyo's grandfather. He is the supreme arbiter of disputes and duels in the academy when they arise, and has a lot of influence in the martial arts world as the teacher of Momoyo, 'The God of Battle'. It’s said that Tesshin was alive during the Sino-Japanese war.

Umeko Kojima is the homeroom teacher of class 2-F. She uses a whip to punish the students who do not pay attention in class. Her students call her Ume-sensei or Oni-Kojima when she's not around. She is single and has never had a boyfriend since she's dedicated her life to her studies and later to her career. She is very perceptive of other people when they talk about her age.

The Homeroom Teacher of class 2-S and has quite the air of a deadbeat. However, he gives very practical, down to earth advice and is surprisingly strong. He is apparently in love with his fellow teacher Umeko, and almost all of his attempts to make her fall in love with him ends in a complete failure. Despite this, he still does not give up.

The assistant master at the Kawakami temple as well as the PE teacher at the academy. He's very kind and easy going and is especially fond of Kazuko, contrasting how Shakadou favored Momoyo. Despite looking in his late 20s, he's 43. He likes inventing new moves, but seems to have trouble coming up with names for them.

The strange Japanese History Teacher who refers to himself in third person. Has an obsession with the nobility and he'd much prefer to live in feudal Japan. He's rude, self centered and willing to abuse his family's position to hurt people. Further, despite teaching history, he only teaches about the Heian period because he hates every other part of Japanese history.

Kuki Corporation

Eldest child of the Kuki family, she is one of the Big Four and something of a rival to Momoyo, though clearly inferior in ability. Hideo freaks out at the sheer mention of her name, although she's nicer to Monshiro. She has a good relationship with the members of Kawakami Temple, even though she practices a different fighting style. Like her little brother Hideo, she likes to hug her subordinates but she only does it to the female ones. She is a character originally from Kimi ga Aruji de Shitsuji ga Ore de.

Youngest child of the Kuki family, and one of the new heroines in S. Is remarkably mature and detail-oriented in spite of being the youngest sibling. She's much friendlier than her arrogant but well meaning older brother and gets along well with Yamato and his friends whether you pursue her or not. Monshiro transferred to class 1-S in Kawakami Academy since she skipped several grades, with the Kuki Family's butler Hyumu Hellsing, so that she is taken care of in school. In a future alternate route, where Yamato and Monshiro become close, she mentions how everyone shortens her name as "Mon", Yamato calls by her full name in private only as he and Monshiro got married soon after.

Matriarch of the Kuki family. An extremely strict and prideful woman, she can be very hard to get along with and is feared by basically everyone who meets her. While she does care for her children, she shows her loves by making them work constantly to become proper heirs to their prestigious family name. She has trouble getting along with Monshiro since she's the child of her husband and a mistress, but thanks to Yamato they start getting along.

Head of the Kuki family and CEO of the Kuki Corporation, though he's almost always away. He's a lecherous slacker who does not take anything very seriously. After hearing of his exploits Yamato reaches the conclusion that he has Cap's level of luck.

The strongest out of all the maids and butlers who serve the Kuki group, ranked #0. He is also the personal butler of Mikado and Tsubone Kuki. During S, he acts as Monshiro's personal bodyguard while she attends Kawakami Academy. His sole weakness is caused by his age, though it hardly stops him, and he and Tesshin both love ogling women.

Ranked #2 between the maids and butlers of the Kuki group. An elderly woman in charge of the Bushido Plan, which resulted in the cloning of several legendary heroes. She disapproves of younger people, believing they lack ability. Can become younger and much more powerful through a special technique.

An elderly member the Kuki Corporation Servant Unit, ranked third behind Miss Marple, Azumi and Hume. He is considered a perfect gentleman.

Zozuma is the rank 4 attendant, a big black man who spends much of his time in Africa. He's usually quite serious, but apparently has really strange hobbies and a terrible sense of humor.

Dominguez is the rank 11 servant and a former bodyguard from Mexico. Though not a martial artist, he's very strong and resilient. He's known to not speak more than necessary.

Rank #15 attendant, Stacy is a blond maid and former mercenary hailing from the streets of Miami. She was forcibly recruited into the Kuki corporation after she showed up to make fun of Azumi for becoming a maid only to be beaten by Hume. Stacy was trained in the United States Military Force, and knows how to use all kind of guns, along with being an expert in close combat. Stacy's strongest and perhaps only real technique is called Ultra Rock. It makes her much stronger and faster, but she also becomes extremely aggressive and feral.

Lee is the rank #16 maid and a former assassin that once targeted Mikado. After being foiled, she was recruited into the Kuki corporation. Contrasting her former occupation, she's rather motherly and has an awful sense of humor. She is not as strong as Stacy, but is very intelligent and a much more competent attendant. Jinchu is trained in Chinese martial arts and Chinese kempo which makes her an expert in combat, with weapons or without them, she also helps with anti assassination work.

The ranked 42 butler of the Kuki corporation, he's fairly unpopular due to his slimy attitude and fixation on his mother. Koi was given the task to look around the world and search for people with overwhelming skills. He was the one who scouted Tsubame Matsunaga. Koi is superficially polite, but also condescending and hostile.

Sheila is a former mercenary from Brazil and acquaintance of Stacy's. Though she acts cutesy, she's as poisonous as her powers. She was born with the ability to produce poisons from her body or add them to her body and mix them up. Sheila relies completely on poisons to fight. They’re effective, but against an opponent that guards themselves cleverly she has essentially no other tricks to use.

Ageha's butler, ranked 999 of the servants of the Kuki Corporation, he is considered the weakest of them all and is only kept around due to sharing Ageha's rare blood type. Still, he's intensely loyal to his master and makes up for his lack of any skill with enthusiasm alone.

The Bushido Plan

A female clone made by the Kuki Corporation, she was raised with Benkei and Yoichi from a young age, and acts as the leader of their group. All 3 grow up like sibling but still retain their master/servant relationship from the past heroes. Her weapon is katana, but she is still quite capable without it and she's good with the flute. Teased mercilessly by Benkei, she's at least as good as Mayucchi, but tends to be lack subtlety, is socially clumsy and a bit of a crybaby.

The busty and strong, laid-back and life-long companion of Yoshitsune and Yoichi. Benkei loves teasing Yoshitsune and has decided the best way to keep Yoichi in line is with threats of violence. She's rather popular with guys as well as being quite approachable due to her laid back attitude. Benkei’s best move requires her to be badly beaten down without getting knocked out. She's quite good at cooking, is an excellent shogi player and likes collecting sake without actually drinking it.

A new transfer student in Kawakami Academy. The paranoid, angsty but brilliant archer companion of Yoshitsune and Benkei. He's actually a clone made by the Kuki Corporation. Despite his apparent distrust, he's actually easily tricked or persuaded if you take the right attitude. He surpasses Miyako in both strength and stamina and rivals her in accuracy. He has good looks, but his bizarre personality keeps him from being too popular.

A book-loving girl that gets transferred to 3-S. She is also a clone, but Kuki executives keep her true identity quite secret, even from her. Seiso is a clone of Kouu (Xiang Yu), a Chinese general. She possesses an alternate personality named Haou, who is very arrogant and has a lot of pride in her abilities and skills which in her own route causes her own downfall. Fortunately, she's able to actually learn from her mistakes. Her fighting skills are easily on par at the level of Momoyo, Tesshin's or Hume's if not greater than theirs.

Other characters
　

 An egg-shaped robot invented by the Kuki family and given to the Kazama family as a gift. Lives with the Kazama family and can make popcorn soda and other foods and drinks appear from inside itself. Cookie now refers to Shoichi as his master (Kazuko as his former master), but serves all the members of the Kazama family. Has a small favoritism, noticed by Yamato, toward Miyako. Cookie explains it's because she diligently polishes Cookie, while cleaning the secret base for the Kazama Family in return. Despite being a robot, Cookie has emotions and can act accordingly to them. He has three official transformations; his normal mode, his transformation mode, which carries an energy blade and is capable of matching superhuman skills, and also a brain mode.

　

A former assistant master at the Kawakami Temple, Shakadou is an extremely strong fighter but was too brutal for Tesshin's tastes and was fired. He and Momoyo appear to get along well due to their fixation on fighting and power. Shakadou does not really seem to have much malice, he just likes fighting for its own sake. When he is not fighting, he's rather laid back and friendly in his own way. He is the main character of his own spin-off called Shakadou no Jun'ai Road where he moves out of Kawakami Prefecture and befriends a girl named Sakura Kugenuma. He's the teacher of the Itagaki siblings, since he thought they had far too much talent to simply ignore, but that the Kawakami academy would never accept such violent students.

The second eldest of the Itagaki siblings, Tatsuko is a lazy, slow girl that is constantly sleeping or wishing she was. Though easygoing, she's also one of Shakadou's pupils and does not hold any real malice. Oddly, however, he does not seem to want to train her. She's instantly infatuated with Yamato. and she's always very strong and durable, but her true potential is only seen when she loses control and her brute force can match Momoyo's. She works as a security guard. She and Benkei became friends when they faced Tsubame Matsunaga in a tournament.

The eldest of the Itagaki siblings. She runs an S&M club and says she's looking for the ultimate masochist. In her job she prefers to do nothing of note to her clients, which drives them into a frenzy with anticipation and frustration. She wields a staff in battle and surprisingly enough, she has some pretty good domestic skills.

Tatsuko's younger twin brother. He's a violent thug and fond of raping other men. Unlike the quasi-legal professions of Tatsuko and Ami, he's fully embraced a life of crime and revels in destruction, but he still loves his family and his boss. He is not a martial artist, but still probably stronger than Angel at least.

The youngest and most emotional of the Itagaki siblings. She's a bit spoiled by her older siblings and spends most of her free time at the arcade. She fights using a golf club and uses a stimulant in battle to increase her performance. Though easily angered, Angel is especially touchy regarding her name.

Anime
An anime television series adaptation was announced on January 18, 2011. The series was animated by Lerche, directed by Keitaro Motonaga, and the scripts are by Katsuhiko Takayama. The anime aired on AT-X from October 1 to December 18, 2011. Sentai Filmworks licensed the series in North America. The series was simulcasted through the Anime Network as well as being streamed on Hulu, then released on home video in 2012. the anime has one opening theme and ending theme. The opening theme is 'U-n-d-e-r-STANDING' by SV TRIBE, while the ending theme is 'Kimi no Maji o Chōdai'.

Reception

Maji de Watashi ni Koi Shinasai! topped the Getchu Annual Sales Ranking for PC games in 2009, and was ranked highly by user votes, coming in 2nd place overall, 9th in System, 10th in Music, and 6th in Movie (referring to the opening and ending animations) among games from that year.

The sequel, Maji de Watashi ni Koishinasai! S, was awarded the Silver Grand Prize in the 2012 Moe Game Awards.

See also
Kimi ga Aruji de Shitsuji ga Ore de

References

External links
Maji de Watashi ni Koishinasai! official website 
Maji de Watashi ni Koishinasai! S official website 
Maji de Watashi ni Koishinasai! A official website 
Official anime website 
Majikoi ~ Oh! Samurai Girls! at Sentai Filmworks

2009 video games
2011 Japanese television series debuts
Anime television series based on video games
Bishōjo games
DVD interactive technology
Eroge
Japan-exclusive video games
Lerche (studio)
Sentai Filmworks
Video games developed in Japan
Visual novels
Windows games
Harem anime and manga
Harem video games
PlayStation 3 games
Seinen manga